Neonella is a genus of jumping spiders that was first described by Carl Eduard Adolph Gerstaecker in 1936. The name is a combination of the related spider genus Neon and the suffix "-ella".

Species
 it contains fourteen species, found in the Caribbean, Paraguay, Brazil, Argentina, and the United States:
Neonella acostae Rubio, Argañaraz & Gleiser, 2015 – Argentina
Neonella antillana Galiano, 1988 – Jamaica
Neonella camillae Edwards, 2003 – USA
Neonella choanocytica Salgado & Ruiz, 2018 – Brazil
Neonella colalao Galiano, 1998 – Argentina
Neonella gyrinus Salgado & Ruiz, 2018 – Brazil
Neonella lubrica Galiano, 1988 – Brazil, Paraguay
Neonella mayaguez Galiano, 1998 – Puerto Rico
Neonella minuta Galiano, 1965 – Brazil, Argentina
Neonella montana Galiano, 1988 – Brazil, Argentina
Neonella nana Galiano, 1988 – Paraguay
Neonella noronha Ruiz, Brescovit & Freitas, 2007 – Brazil
Neonella salafraria Ruiz & Brescovit, 2004 – Brazil
Neonella vinnula Gertsch, 1936 (type) – USA

References

External links
 Pictures of N. vinnula

Salticidae
Salticidae genera
Spiders of North America
Spiders of South America
Taxa named by Willis J. Gertsch